The SCW Heavyweight Championship was a professional wrestling regional championship in Southern Championship Wrestling (SCW). It remained active until early-1990 when SCW was closed.

The inaugural champion was "Gentleman" Chris Adams, who defeated Buck Robley in a tournament final on June 25, 1988 to become the first SCW Heavyweight Champion. "Outlaw" Joel Deaton holds the record for most reigns, with two. At 114 days, Deaton's first reign is the longest in the title's history. The Bullet's only reign was the shortest in the history of the title holding the belt for only 14 days before losing it to "Wildfire" Tommy Rich. Overall, there have been 8 reigns shared between 7 wrestlers, with one vacancy, and 1 deactivation.

Title history

References
 General
 

 Specific

Heavyweight wrestling championships